Belehzin, also rendered as Balazin and Belezin, may refer to:
 Belehzin-e Olya
 Belehzin-e Sofla